On March 25, 1969, Luis Antonio Frese hijacked Delta Air Lines Flight 821 (DC-8) from Dallas, Texas to Havana, Cuba. Frese was indicted in Texas but never returned to the United States to face prosecution. He reportedly died in Cuba in 1975.

The plane was en route from Newark to Los Angeles with stop overs in Atlanta, Dallas and San Diego. There were 114 people on board: seven crew and 107 passengers, which included 26 Marine recruits en route to San Diego and additional military personnel. This was the 14th hijacking of a US airliner in the year 1969. After being hijacked to Havana, the flight diverted to Miami before continuing on its planned route.

Related pages
TWA Flight 106
List of Cuba–United States aircraft hijackings

References

Aircraft hijackings in the United States
Aviation accidents and incidents in the United States in 1969
1969 in Cuba
Terrorist incidents in North America in 1969
821
Accidents and incidents involving the Douglas DC-8
March 1969 events in North America
Terrorist incidents in the United States in 1969